Armon can refer to:

Armon (1986 film) an Uzbekistani film.
RMON (Remote Monitoring), standard used in telecommunications equipment.

Name
Armon (given name), is a male given name of Hebrew origin, the direct translation meaning "high place".

Places
Armon HaNetziv, an Israeli neighborhood in southern East Jerusalem.

People
Dan Armon, Israeli poet.
Armon Ben-Naim, Israeli professional association football player.
Armon Bassett, American former professional basketball player.
Armon Johnson, American professional basketball player.
Armon Binns, American football wide receiver.
Armon Trick, retired German international rugby union player.
Armen Gilliam (born Armon Louis Gilliam), American professional basketball player.

Characters
Armon is one of the lead characters of Mummies Alive!.
Armon Gill, also known as the Chief Judge's Man, is a fictional villain from the Judge Dredd comic strip.